In mathematics, infinitesimal cohomology is a cohomology theory for algebraic varieties introduced by . In characteristic 0 it is essentially the same as crystalline cohomology. In nonzero characteristic p  showed that it is closely related to etale cohomology with mod p coefficients, a theory known to have undesirable properties.

References

.
.

Algebraic geometry
Cohomology theories